Gunn is a hamlet in Alberta, Canada within Lac Ste. Anne County. It is located west of the junction of Highway 43 and Highway 33 on the northeast shore of Lac Ste. Anne.

The hamlet is located in Census Division No. 13 and in the federal riding of Yellowhead.

The community has the name of Peter Gunn, Hudson's Bay Company factor at Lac Ste. Anne and first MLA for that constituency.

The first post office was established in 1915.

Demographics 

As a designated place in the 2016 Census of Population conducted by Statistics Canada, Gunn had a population of 10 living in 4 of its 10 total private dwellings, an increase from its 2011 population of 0.

See also 
List of communities in Alberta
List of designated places in Alberta
List of hamlets in Alberta
Peter Gunn (Alberta politician)

References 

Hamlets in Alberta
Designated places in Alberta
Lac Ste. Anne County